Jamie Walker (born 20 December 1991) is an English international bowls player.

Bowls career

Outdoors
In 2013, he won two gold medals at the European Bowls Championships in Spain.

He was named as the 2015 Thomas Taylor 'Bowler of the Year' after securing a National title in 2015 and winning the singles gold medal and the triples bronze medal at the Atlantic Bowls Championships. In 2016 he won two more National titles, the Junior singles and Mixed fours at Leamington Spa.

In December 2016 he was part of the triples team with Andy Knapper and Robert Paxton who won the gold medal at the 2016 World Outdoor Bowls Championship in Christchurch.

He has won six National Championship titles in 2011, 2013, 2015 (x 2), 2016 and 2017.

In 2019 he won the singles and pairs gold medal at the Atlantic Bowls Championships and in 2020 he was selected for the 2020 World Outdoor Bowls Championship in Australia.

In 2022, he competed in the men's singles and the men's pairs at the 2022 Commonwealth Games. Partnering Sam Tolchard he won the pairs silver medal, losing out to Wales in the final.

Indoors
Walker made a sensational debut at the 2023 World Indoor Bowls Championship by winning the singles event, beating Jason Banks in the final.

References

English male bowls players
Bowls World Champions
1991 births
Living people
Bowls European Champions
Bowls players at the 2022 Commonwealth Games
Commonwealth Games silver medallists for England
Commonwealth Games medallists in lawn bowls
Indoor Bowls World Champions
Medallists at the 2022 Commonwealth Games